Chassalia is a genus of flowering plants in the family Rubiaceae. The genus is found from tropical Africa to (sub)tropical Asia.

Species 

 Chassalia acutiflora Bremek.
 Chassalia afzelii (Hiern) K.Schum.
 Chassalia albiflora K.Krause
 Chassalia ambodirianensis Bremek.
 Chassalia androrangensis Bremek.
 Chassalia angustifolia (Ridl.) A.P.Davis
 Chassalia assimilis Bremek.
 Chassalia betamponensis Bremek.
 Chassalia betsilensis Bremek.
 Chassalia bicostata O.Lachenaud & Jongkind
 Chassalia bipindensis Sonké, Nguembou & A.P.Davis
 Chassalia blumeana Govaerts
 Chassalia bojeri Bremek.
 Chassalia bonifacei Thulin & S.Mankt.
 Chassalia boryana DC.
 Chassalia bosseri Verdc.
 Chassalia bracteata Ridl.
 Chassalia buchwaldii K.Schum.
 Chassalia capitata DC.
 Chassalia catatii Drake ex Bremek.
 Chassalia caudifolia Bremek.
 Chassalia chartacea Craib
 Chassalia christineae Thulin & S.Mankt.
 Chassalia chrysoclada (K.Schum.) O.Lachenaud
 Chassalia comorensis Bremek.
 Chassalia corallifera (A.Chev. ex De Wild.) Hepper
 Chassalia corallioides (Cordem.) Verdc.
 Chassalia coriacea Verdc.
 Chassalia coursii Bremek.
 Chassalia cristata (Hiern) Bremek.
 Chassalia cupularis Hutch. & Dalziel
 Chassalia curviflora (Wall.) Thwaites
 Chassalia densiflora Bremek.
 Chassalia densifolia Bremek.
 Chassalia discolor K.Schum.
 Chassalia doniana (Benth.) G.Taylor
 Chassalia elliptica (Ridl.) A.P.Davis
 Chassalia elongata Hutch. & Dalziel
 Chassalia euchlora (K.Schum.) Figueiredo
 Chassalia eurybotrya Bremek.
 Chassalia gaertneroides (Cordem.) Verdc.
 Chassalia gracilis Stapf
 Chassalia grandifolia DC.
 Chassalia grandistipula Bremek.
 Chassalia griffithii Hook.f.
 Chassalia hallii W.D.Hawth. & Jongkind
 Chassalia hasseltiana Miq.
 Chassalia hiernii (Kuntze) G.Taylor
 Chassalia humbertii Bremek.
 Chassalia ischnophylla (K.Schum.) Hepper
 Chassalia javanica (Blume) Piessch.
 Chassalia kenyensis Verdc.
 Chassalia kolly (Schumach.) Hepper
 Chassalia laikomensis Cheek
 Chassalia lanceolata (Poir.) A.Chev.
 Chassalia laxiflora Benth.
 Chassalia leandrii Bremek.
 Chassalia leptothyrsa Bremek.
 Chassalia longiloba Borhidi & Verdc.
 Chassalia lukwangulensis Thulin
 Chassalia lushaiensis (C.E.C.Fisch.) Fisch.
 Chassalia lutescens O.Lachenaud & D.J.Harris
 Chassalia macrodiscus K.Schum.
 Chassalia magnificens O.Lachenaud
 Chassalia magnifolia Bremek.
 Chassalia melanocarpa (Ridl.) A.P.Davis
 Chassalia membranacea Craib
 Chassalia microphylla Craib
 Chassalia minor Ridl.
 Chassalia moramangensis Bremek.
 Chassalia nannochlamys (Bakh.f.) A.P.Davis
 Chassalia northiana T.Y.Yu
 Chassalia obscurinervia Elmer
 Chassalia oxylepis Miq.
 Chassalia parva Bremek.
 Chassalia parvifolia K.Schum.
 Chassalia pedicellata Valeton
 Chassalia pentachotoma Bremek.
 Chassalia perrieri Bremek.
 Chassalia petitiana Piesschaert
 Chassalia petrinensis Verdc.
 Chassalia pleuroneura (K.Schum.) O.Lachenaud
 Chassalia porcata (I.M.Turner) A.P.Davis
 Chassalia princei (Dubard & Dop) Bremek.
 Chassalia propinqua Ridl.
 Chassalia pteropetala (K.Schum.) Cheek
 Chassalia pubescens Ridl.
 Chassalia quaternifolia Bremek.
 Chassalia richardii Bremek.
 Chassalia ridleyi (King) A.P.Davis
 Chassalia simplex K.Krause
 Chassalia singapurensis (Ridl.) A.P.Davis
 Chassalia staintonii (H.Hara) Deb & Mondal
 Chassalia stenantha Bremek.
 Chassalia stenothyrsa Bremek.
 Chassalia subcordatifolia (De Wild.) Piesschaert
 Chassalia subcoriacea (Ridl.) A.P.Davis
 Chassalia subherbacea (Hiern) Hepper
 Chassalia subnuda (Hiern) Hepper
 Chassalia subochreata (De Wild.) Robyns
 Chassalia subspicata K.Schum.
 Chassalia tahanica (I.M.Turner) A.P.Davis
 Chassalia tchibangensis Pellegr.
 Chassalia ternifolia (Baker) Bremek.
 Chassalia tricepa (Ridl.) A.P.Davis
 Chassalia tsaratanensis Bremek.
 Chassalia ugandensis Verdc.
 Chassalia umbraticola Vatke
 Chassalia vanderystii (De Wild.) Verdc.
 Chassalia vernosa Boivin ex Bremek.
 Chassalia verticillata Bremek.
 Chassalia violacea K.Schum.
 Chassalia virgata Talbot
 Chassalia zenkeri K.Schum.
 Chassalia zimmermannii Verdc.

References

External links 
 Chassalia in the World Checklist of Rubiaceae

Rubiaceae genera
Palicoureeae